The Seigneurie of Elbeuf, later a marquisate, dukedom, and peerage, was based on the territory of Elbeuf in the Vexin, possessed first by the Counts of Valois and then the Counts of Meulan before passing to the  House of Harcourt. In 1265, it was erected into a seigneurie for them. Occupied by the English from 1419 to 1444, it passed by marriage to the Lorraine-Vaudémont, a cadet branch of the sovereign House of Lorraine, in 1452. When René of Vaudémont inherited Lorraine, he left the Harcourt inheritance, including Elbeuf, to his second son Claude, Duke of Guise. Elbeuf was raised to a marquisate in 1528. Claude, in turn, left Elbeuf to his youngest son René. It was elevated to a ducal peerage in 1581 for his son Charles, and the title became extinct in 1825.

Lords of Elbeuf (1265)

House of Harcourt

John I of Harcourt (1265–1288)
John II of Harcourt (1288–1302), also Lord of Harcourt
John III of Harcourt (1302–1329), also Lord of Harcourt
John IV of Harcourt (1329–1346), also Count of Harcourt
John V of Harcourt (1346–1355), also Count of Harcourt and Aumale
John VI of Harcourt (1355–1389), also Count of Harcourt and Aumale
John VII of Harcourt (1389–1419), also Count of Harcourt and Aumale

English lords
Thomas of Lancaster, 1st Duke of Clarence (1419–1421)
John of Lancaster, 1st Duke of Bedford (1421–1425)
Thomas Beaufort, 1st Duke of Exeter (1425–1426)
John Beaufort, 1st Duke of Somerset (1426–1444)

House of Harcourt (restored)
John VII of Harcourt (1444–1452), also Count of Harcourt and Aumale
Marie of Harcourt (1452–1476), married Antoine, Count of Vaudémont

House of Lorraine
Antoine, Count of Vaudémont (1452–1458) (with Marie)
John of Vaudémont (1458–1473) (with Marie), also Count of Harcourt and Aumale
René II, Duke of Lorraine (1473–1508) (with Marie 1473–1476)
Claude, Duke of Guise (1508–1528)

Marquises of Elbeuf (1528)
Claude, Duke of Guise (1528–1550)
René, Marquis of Elbeuf (1550–1566)
Charles, Marquis of Elbeuf (1566–1582)

Dukes of Elbeuf (1582)
Charles I, Duke of Elbeuf (1582–1605)
Charles II, Duke of Elbeuf (1605–1657)
Charles III, Duke of Elbeuf (1657–1692) father-in-law to Charles IV, Duke of Mantua
Henry, Duke of Elbeuf (1692–1748)
Emmanuel Maurice, Duke of Elbeuf (1748–1763)
Charles-Eugène, Duke of Elbeuf (1763–1825)

References

 
 
 
Noble titles created in 1265
Noble titles created in 1528
Noble titles created in 1581